The forest shrews are the members of the genus Sylvisorex. They are mammals in the family Soricidae and are found only in Africa. The genus name comes from the Latin world "silva" which means "forest" and "sorex", which means "shrew-mouse". This reflects the nature of these shrews, which prefer forest habitats. All shrews are carnivorous, and eat continually to satisfy their high metabolic rate.

The genus contains these species:

 Akaibe's forest shrew, Sylvisorex akaibei
 Cameroonian forest shrew, Sylvisorex cameruniensis
 Corbet's forest shrew, Sylvisorex corbeti
 Grant's forest shrew, Sylvisorex granti
 Howell's forest shrew, Sylvisorex howelli
 Bioko forest shrew, Sylvisorex isabellae
 Johnston's forest shrew, Sylvisorex johnstoni
 Kongana shrew, Sylvisorex konganensis
 Moon forest shrew, Sylvisorex lunaris
 Mount Cameroon forest shrew, Sylvisorex morio
 Greater forest shrew, Sylvisorex ollula
 Lesser forest shrew, Sylvisorex oriundus
 Rain forest shrew, Sylvisorex pluvialis
 Bamenda forest shrew, Sylvisorex silvanorum
 Volcano shrew, Sylvisorex vulcanorum

References

 
Mammal genera
 
Taxa named by Oldfield Thomas
Taxonomy articles created by Polbot